Provotorova is feminine counterpart of a Russian surname Provotorov. Notable people with the surname include:

 Inna Yuryevna Provotorova (born 1974), Russian actress
 Sofia Denisovna Provotorova (born 2003), Russian athlete, short-distance runner

 Also
 Provotorova, Kursk Oblast, a village in Oktyabrsky District of Kursk Oblast

Russian-language surnames